Chris Manhertz (born April 10, 1992) is an American football tight end for the Denver Broncos of the National Football League (NFL). He was signed by the Buffalo Bills as an undrafted free agent in 2015. He played college basketball at Canisius.

Early life
Manhertz was born in the Bronx, New York. He attended Cardinal Spellman High School, then Canisius College, a Buffalo, New York-based Catholic school that had abolished its football program in 2003. Manhertz played for the Canisius Golden Griffins men's basketball squad from 2010 to 2014, where he was a standout player and three-year captain for the squad.

Professional career

Buffalo Bills
Upon graduating college, Manhertz, who had never before played football and whose only experience with the game came from the Madden NFL series, began training to change sports and pursue a career in professional football. He was offered a tryout from the Buffalo Bills and was signed a future/reserve contract in May 2015, although coach Rex Ryan admitted his chances of making the roster were a longshot. He did not make the Bills' preseason roster.

New Orleans Saints
Manhertz joined the New Orleans Saints after being released by the Bills and spent the season on the Saints' practice squad. Manhertz made the Saints' active roster to start the 2016 season and made his NFL debut on September 18, 2016. He was released on October 16, 2016.

Carolina Panthers
Manhertz was claimed off waivers by the Carolina Panthers on October 17, 2016.

He played in 16 games with four starts in 2017 in place of the injured Greg Olsen, recording two catches for 17 yards. He suffered a high ankle sprain in Week 17 and was placed on injured reserve.

In Week 15 of the 2018 season, Manhertz caught his first career touchdown on a trick-play 50-yard pass from running back Christian McCaffrey.

On January 29, 2019, Manhertz signed a two-year contract extension with the Panthers and was named the starter for the 2020 season.

Jacksonville Jaguars
On March 17, 2021, Manhertz signed a two-year, $6.65 million contract with the Jacksonville Jaguars. During a Week 1 game against the Houston Texans, Manhertz caught a 22-yard touchdown pass from rookie quarterback Trevor Lawrence. It was the first career touchdown pass for Lawrence.

Denver Broncos
On March 15, 2023, Manhertz signed a two-year contract with the Denver Broncos.

Career statistics

Regular season

References

External links
Carolina Panthers bio
NFL.com bio

1992 births
Living people
American football tight ends
American men's basketball players
Basketball players from New York City
Buffalo Bills players
Canisius Golden Griffins men's basketball players
Cardinal Spellman High School (New York City) alumni
Carolina Panthers players
Denver Broncos players
Jacksonville Jaguars players
New Orleans Saints players
Sportspeople from the Bronx
Players of American football from New York City